Chameleon is the debut extended play (EP) by American electronic duo Grey. Released on September 29, 2017, it features vocalists Asia Whiteacre, Skott, Avril Lavigne, Circa Survive frontman Anthony Green, Frances and Stephen.

Background and Release
The track "Chameleon" was featured in a promotional tweet on April 27, 2017, the first known audio from the EP. An official announcement was revealed via Twitter on September 7, 2017, alongside the announcement and release of the promotional single "Crime" featuring Skott. The EP was given a September 29 release date.

Track listing

References 

2017 debut EPs
Electronic EPs